The Bible code, also known as the Torah code, is a purported set of encoded words within a Hebrew text of the Torah that, according to proponents, has predicted significant historical events. The statistical likelihood of the Bible code arising by chance has been thoroughly researched, and it is now widely considered to be statistically insignificant, as similar phenomena can be observed in any sufficiently lengthy text. Although Bible codes have been postulated and studied for centuries, the subject has been popularized in modern times by Michael Drosnin's book The Bible Code and the movie The Omega Code.

Some tests purportedly showing statistically significant codes in the Bible were published as a "challenging puzzle" in a peer-reviewed academic journal in 1994, which was pronounced "solved" in a subsequent 1999 paper published in the same journal.

Overview

Contemporary discussion and controversy around one specific steganographic method became widespread in 1994 when Doron Witztum, Eliyahu Rips and Yoav Rosenberg published a paper, "Equidistant Letter Sequences in the Book of Genesis", in the scientific journal Statistical Science. The paper, which was presented by the journal as a "challenging puzzle", presented what appeared to be strong statistical evidence that biographical information about famous rabbis was encoded in the text of the Book of Genesis, centuries before those rabbis lived.

Since then the term "Bible codes" has been popularly used to refer specifically to information encrypted via this ELS method.

Equidistant Letter Sequence method

The primary method by which purportedly meaningful messages have been extracted is the Equidistant Letter Sequence (ELS), also referred to as dilug (דילג, "skipping [of letters]"). Letters are selected based on a starting point and counting every nth letter based on a given 'skip number' in a given direction. For example, taking every fourth letter in the phrase this sentence fits an ELS, read backwards and ignoring spaces derives the word 'Safest'.

In some cases, multiple terms may be derived from an 'ELS letter array' (text in a grid, with the same number of letters in each line). In the example provided, part of the King James Version's rendering of Genesis (26:5–10) is shown with 21 letters per line, showing ELSs for "Bible" and "code".

Although the example shown uses English texts, Bible codes proponents usually use a Hebrew Bible text. Most Jewish proponents use only the Torah (Genesis–Deuteronomy), as it is believed to have been revealed directly to Moses.

ELS extensions

Once a specific word has been found using the ELS method, other words are sought based on the same letter spacing. Code proponents Haralick and Rips have published an example of a longer, extended ELS, which reads, "Destruction I will call you; cursed is Bin Laden and revenge is to the Messiah".

Proponents claim that such ELS extensions that form phrases or sentences have statistical significance, maintaining that the longer the extended ELS, the less likely it is to be the result of chance. Critics reply, as in the Skeptical Inquirer deconstruction of 1997, that the longer ELS is in fact effectively nothing more than further increased number of permutations, employing a massive application of the Look-elsewhere effect.

History

Early history

Jewish culture has a long tradition of interpretation, annotation, and commentary regarding the Bible, leading to both exegesis and eisegesis (drawing meaning from and imposing meaning on the texts). The Bible code can be viewed as a part of this tradition, albeit one of the more controversial parts. Throughout history, many Jewish, and later Christian, scholars have attempted to find hidden or coded messages within the Bible's text, notably including Isaac Newton.

The 13th-century Spanish rabbi Bachya ben Asher may have been the first to describe an ELS in the Bible. His four-letter example related to the traditional zero-point of the Hebrew calendar. Over the following centuries there are hints that the ELS technique was known, e.g. in Pardes Rimonim of the 16th century mystic Moshe Cordovero, but few definite examples have been found from before the middle of the 20th century. At this point many examples were found by Michael Ber Weissmandl and published by his students after his death in 1957. Nevertheless, the practice remained known to only a few until the early 1980s, when some discoveries of Israeli school teacher Avraham Oren came to the attention of the mathematician Eliyahu Rips at the Hebrew University of Jerusalem. Rips then took up the study together with his religious studies partners Doron Witztum and Alexander Rotenberg, among several others.

Rips and Witztum

Rips and Witztum and Yoav Rosenberg designed computer software for the ELS technique and subsequently found many examples. About 1985, they decided to carry out a formal test, and the "Great rabbis experiment" was born. This experiment tested the hypothesis that ELS's of the names of famous rabbinic personalities and their respective birth and death dates form a more compact arrangement than could be explained by chance. Their definition of "compact" was complex but, roughly, two ELSs were compactly arranged if they can be displayed together in a small window. When Rips et al. carried out the experiment, the data was measured and found to be statistically significant, supporting their hypothesis.

The "great rabbis experiment" went through several iterations, and was eventually published in 1994, in the peer-reviewed journal Statistical Science. The editorial board was highly skeptical due to the fact that computers can be used to "mine" data for patterns that intuitively seem surprising, but upon careful analysis are found not be statistically significant. While they did find a number of possible sources of error, they were unable to find anyone willing to put in the substantial time and energy required to properly reanalyze all data. However, they did find it intriguing, and therefore decided to offer it as a "challenging puzzle" for anyone interested in doing so. An unintended result of this was that outsiders mistook this as a confirmation of the paper's claims.

Other experiments

Another experiment, in which the names of the famous rabbis were matched against the places of their births and deaths (rather than the dates), was conducted in 1997 by Harold Gans, former Senior Cryptologic Mathematician for the United States National Security Agency.

Again, the results were interpreted as being meaningful and thus suggestive of a more than chance result. These Bible codes became known to the public primarily due to the American journalist Michael Drosnin, whose book The Bible Code (1997) was a best-seller in many countries. Rips issued a public statement that he did not support Drosnin's work or conclusions; even Gans has stated that, although the book says the codes in the Torah can be used to predict future events, "This is absolutely unfounded. There is no scientific or mathematical basis for such a statement, and the reasoning used to come to such a conclusion in the book is logically flawed." In 2002, Drosnin published a second book on the same subject, called Bible Code II: the Countdown.

The Jewish outreach group Aish HaTorah employs Bible codes in their Discovery Seminars to persuade secular Jews of the divinity of the Torah, and to encourage them to trust in traditional Orthodox Jewish teachings. Use of Bible code techniques also spread into certain Christian circles, especially in the United States. The main early proponents were Yakov Rambsel, who is a Messianic Jew, and Grant Jeffrey. Another Bible code technique was developed in 1997 by Dean Coombs (also Christian). Various pictograms are claimed to be formed by words and sentences using ELS.

Since 2000, physicist Nathan Jacobi, an agnostic Jew, and engineer Moshe Aharon Shak, an orthodox Jew, claim to have discovered hundreds of examples of lengthy, extended ELSs. The number of extended ELSs at various lengths is compared with those expected from a non-encoded text, as determined by a formula from Markov chain theory.

Criticism

The precise order of consonantal letters represented in the Hebrew Masoretic Text is not consistent across manuscripts in any period. It is known from earlier versions, such as the Dead Sea Scrolls, that the number of letters was not constant even in the first centuries CE. The Bible code theory thus does not seem to account for these variations.

The primary objection advanced against Bible codes is that information theory does not prohibit "noise" from appearing to be sometimes meaningful. Thus, if data chosen for ELS experiments are intentionally "cooked" before the experiment is defined, similar patterns can be found in texts other than the Torah. Although the probability of an ELS in a random place being a meaningful word is small, there are so many possible starting points and skip patterns that many such words can be expected to appear, depending on the details chosen for the experiment, and it is possible to "tune" an ELS experiment to achieve a result which appears to exhibit patterns that overcome the level of noise.

Others have criticized Drosnin by saying his example of "Clinton" in his first book violated the basic Bible code concept of "minimality"; Drosnin's "Clinton" was a completely invalid "code". In addition, McKay claimed that Drosnin had used the flexibility of Hebrew orthography to his advantage, freely mixing classic (no vowels, Y and W strictly consonant) and modern (Y and W used to indicate 'i' and 'u' vowels) modes, as well as variances in spelling of K and T, to reach the desired meaning.

Criticism of the original paper

In 1999, Australian mathematician Brendan McKay, Israeli mathematicians Dror Bar-Natan and Gil Kalai, and Israeli psychologist Maya Bar-Hillel (collectively known as "MBBK") published a paper in Statistical Science, in which they argued that the case of Witztum, Rips and Rosenberg (WRR) was "fatally defective, and that their result merely reflects on the choices made in designing their experiment and collecting the data for it." The MBBK paper was reviewed anonymously by four professional statisticians prior to publication. In the introduction to the paper, Robert Kass, the Editor of the Journal who previously had described the WRR paper as a "challenging puzzle" wrote that "considering the work of McKay, Bar-Natan, Kalai and Bar-Hillel as a whole it indeed appears, as they conclude, that the puzzle has been solved".

From their observations, MBBK created an alternative hypothesis to explain the "puzzle" of how the codes were discovered. MBBK's argument was not strictly mathematical, rather it asserted that the WRR authors and contributors had intentionally:

 Selected the names and/or dates in advance, and;
 Designed their experiments to match their selection, thereby achieving their "desired" result.

The MBBK paper argued that the ELS experiment is extraordinarily sensitive to very small changes in the spellings of appellations, and the WRR result "merely reflects on the choices made in designing their experiment and collecting the data for it."

The MBBK paper demonstrated that this "tuning", when combined with what MBBK asserted was available "wiggle" room, was capable of generating a result similar to WRR's Genesis result in a Hebrew translation of War and Peace. Bar-Hillel subsequently summarized the MBBK view that the WRR paper was a hoax, an intentionally and carefully designed "magic trick".

The Bible codes (together with similar arguments concerning hidden prophecies in the writings of Shakespeare) have been quoted as examples of the Texas sharpshooter fallacy.

Replies to MBBK's criticisms

Harold Gans

Harold Gans, a former Cryptanalyst at the National Security Agency, argued that MBBK's hypothesis implies a conspiracy between WRR and their co-contributors to fraudulently tune the appellations in advance. Gans argues that the conspiracy must include Doron Witztum, Eliyahu Rips, and S. Z. Havlin, because they all say Havlin compiled the appellations independently. Gans argues further that such a conspiracy must include the multiple rabbis who have written a letter confirming the accuracy of Havlin's list. Finally, argues Gans, such a conspiracy must also include the multiple participants of the cities experiment conducted by Gans (which includes Gans himself). Gans concludes that "the number of people necessarily involved in [the conspiracy] will stretch the credulity of any reasonable person." Gans further argued that while "the mathematical issues are difficult for non-mathematicians to comprehend, I can summarize as follows: Professor McKay and his colleagues never claimed to have discovered real codes in those non-Torah texts. Their only "successful" results were obtained by deliberately rigging the experiment in such a way that the layman wouldn't recognize the mathematical flaws."

Brendan McKay has replied that he and his colleagues have never accused Havlin or Gans of participating in a conspiracy. Instead, says McKay, Havlin likely did what WRR's early preprints stated he did, in providing "valuable advices". Similarly, McKay accepts Gans's statements that Gans did not prepare the data for his cities experiment himself. McKay concludes that "there is only ONE person who needs to have been involved in knowing fakery, and a handful of his disciples who must be involved in the cover-up (perhaps with good intent)."

WRR authors

The WRR authors issued a series of responses regarding the claims of MBBK, including the claim that no such tuning did or even could have taken place. An earlier WRR response to a request by MBBK authors presented results from additional experiments that used the specific "alternate" name and date formats which MBBK suggested had been intentionally avoided by WRR. Using MBBK's alternates, the results WRR returned showed equivalent or better support for the existence of the codes, and so challenged the "wiggle room" assertion of MBBK. In the wake of the WRR response, author Bar-Natan issued a formal statement of non-response. After a series of exchanges with McKay and Bar-Hillel, WRR author Witztum responded in a new paper claiming that McKay had used smoke screen tactics in creating several straw man arguments, and thereby avoided the points made by WRR authors refuting MBBK. Witztum also claimed that, upon interviewing a key independent expert contracted by McKay for the MBBK paper, some experiments performed for MBBK had validated, rather than refuted, the original WRR findings. Witzum questioned why MBBK had expunged these results. McKay replied to these claims.

No publication in a peer reviewed scientific journal has appeared refuting MBBK's paper. In 2006, four new Torah Codes papers were published at the IEEE Computer Society's 18th International Conference on Pattern Recognition (ICPR'06).

Robert Aumann

Robert Aumann, a game theorist and winner of the Nobel Prize in Economics in 2005, has followed the Bible code research and controversy for many years. He wrote:

Following an analysis of the experiment and the dynamics of the controversy, stating for example that "almost everybody included [in the controversy] made up their mind early in the game", Aumann concluded:

Robert Haralick

Robert Haralick, a Professor of Computer Science at the City University of New York, has checked the Bible Code for many years and became convinced of its validity. He contributed a new experiment, checking whether, besides the minimal ELS – in which it was known that WRR's list was successful in Genesis and MBBK's list was successful in War and Peace – there were other, non-minimal ELSs where there is convergence between the rabbis' names and their respective dates. This had the effect of checking convergence found at 2nd minimal ELSs, 3rd minimal ELSs and so on. According to Haralick, the results were impressive; WRR's list was successful until the 20th minimal ELS, whereas MBBK's list failed after the 2nd minimal ELS. Haralick lectured on the subject in front of the participants of the international conference on pattern recognition in 2006.

Criticism of Michael Drosnin

Journalist Drosnin's books have been criticized by some who believe the Bible code is real but that it cannot predict the future. On Drosnin's claim of Rabin's death, Drosnin wrote in his book "The Bible Code" (1997) that "Yigal Amir could not be found in advance". Critics have noted a huge error in the "code" Drosnin claimed to have found: Drosnin misused the Biblical verse . Scholars note; "For example, citing again the passage intersecting with Rabin: that passage is from Deuteronomy 4:42, but Drosnin ignores the words immediately following "a murderer who will murder." What comes next is the phrase "unwittingly". This is because the verse deals with the cities of refuge where accidental killers can find asylum. In this case, then, the message would refer to an accidental killing of (or by) Rabin and it would therefore be wrong. Another message (p. 17) supposedly contains a "complete" description of the terrorist bombing of a bus in Jerusalem on February 25, 1996. If the phrase does tell of a bus bombing, why not take it to indicate that it would be in Nablus, the site of ancient Shechem?"

Drosnin also made a number of claims and alleged predictions that have since failed. Among the most important, Drosnin clearly states in his book "The Bible Code II", published on December 2, 2002, that there was to be a World War involving an "atomic holocaust" that would allegedly be the end of the world. Another claim Drosnin makes in "The Bible Code II" is that the nation of Libya would develop weapons of mass destruction which would then be given to terrorists who would then use them to attack the West (specifically the United States). In reality, Libya improved relations with the West in 2003 and gave up all their existing weapons of mass destruction programs. A final claim Drosnin made in "The Bible Code II" was that Palestinian Authority leader Yasser Arafat would allegedly be assassinated by being shot to death by gunmen which Drosnin specifically stated would be from the Palestinian Hamas movement. This prediction by Drosnin also failed, as Yasser Arafat died on November 11, 2004 of what was later declared to be natural causes (specifically a stroke brought on by an unknown infection). The only conspiracy theories about Yasser Arafat's allegedly being murdered have been made by a few Palestinian figures, and have involved alleged poisoning that was supposed to have been on the orders of Israeli officials. The only alleged Palestinian collaboration in this conspiracy theory involve two leading Palestinian figures from the Palestinian Fatah movement; those are current Palestinian Authority and Fatah leader Mahmoud Abbas and Mohammed Dahlan the former head of Fatah in Gaza. Writer Randy Ingermanson criticized Drosnin by stating that; "And that's all they are, even for Drosnin – possibilities. He believes that the future is not fixed, and that the Bible code predicts all possible outcomes. Which makes it not much of a predictive tool, but again, he seems not to mind this very much. If you are laying bets based on Drosnin, you had better be willing to bet on all possible outcomes."

Some accuse him of factual errors, claiming that he has much support in the scientific community, mistranslating Hebrew words to make his point more convincing, and using the Bible without proving that other books do not have similar codes.

Criticism using ELS in other texts

Responding to an explicit challenge from Drosnin, who claimed that other texts such as Moby-Dick would not yield ELS results comparable to the Torah, McKay created a new experiment that was tuned to find many ELS letter arrays in Moby-Dick that relate to modern events, including the assassination of Martin Luther King Jr and Indira Gandhi. He also found a code relating to the Rabin assassination, containing the assassin's first and last name and the university he attended, as well as the motive ("Oslo", relating to the Oslo accords). Drosnin and others have responded to these claims, saying the tuning tactics employed by McKay were simply "nonsense", and providing analyses to support their argument that the tables, data and methodologies McKay used to produce the Moby Dick results "simply do not qualify as code tables". Skeptic Dave Thomas claimed to find other examples in many texts. While Thomas' methodology was alleged to have been rebutted by Robert Haralick and others, his broader arguments about the law of large numbers stood essentially unchallenged. Also, Thomas's criticisms were aimed at Drosnin, whose methodology is considered even worse. (In fact, Drosnin's example of "Clinton" in his first book violated the basic Bible code concept of "Minimality"; Drosnin's "Clinton" was a completely invalid "code"). In addition, McKay claimed that Drosnin had used the flexibility of Hebrew orthography to his advantage, freely mixing Masoretic biblical (no vowels, Y and W overwhelmingly consonant) and modern (Y and W used to indicate i and u vowels) modes, as well as variances in spelling of K and T, to reach the desired meaning.

In his television series John Safran vs God, Australian television personality John Safran and McKay again demonstrated the "tuning" technique, demonstrating that these techniques could produce "evidence" of the September 11 terrorist attacks on New York in the lyrics of Vanilla Ice's repertoire. And the influence and consequences of scribal errors (misspellings, additions, deletions, etc.) are hard to account for in claims for a Bible coded message left secretly in the text. McKay and others claim that in the absence of an objective measure of quality and an objective way to select test subjects (though that remains an objection as equally against Drosnin), it is not possible positively to determine whether any particular observation is significant or not. For that reason, outside of Davis' mathematical arguments, much or most of the serious effort of the skeptics has been focused on the scientific claims of Witztum, Rips, and Gans.

Software 
All Bible/Torah code software support ELS search and matrix view of the found word(s) and its context. Some include statistical tools, Hebrew dictionary, gematria calculation and searching for additional words in the letter matrix.

Windows 
 The Bible Code (Windows, open source)  - ELS search, statistical tools
 Bible Code Oracle (Windows, paid / free trial)  - ELS search, English-Hebrew dictionary
 Bible Codes Plus (Windows, paid)  - ELS search, English-Hebrew dictionary, statistical tools
 Torah Codes 2000 (Windows, paid)  - ELS search, English-Hebrew dictionary, statistical tools, gematria, Hebrew calendar and date conversion, letter substitution
 Keys to the Bible (Windows, paid)  - ELS search, English-Hebrew dictionary, statistical tools, gematria, Hebrew calendar and date conversion, letter substitution

Android 
 Torah Code (Android, free)  - ELS search, gematria (with regular, small or Atbash values)
 Torah Codes (Android, paid)  - ELS search, gematria, statistical tools, Atbash and Albam substitution

See also
 Alignment of random points, for another phenomenon of apparently mysterious coincidences
 Atbash
 Biblical archeology
 Bibliomancy
 Confirmation bias
 Gematria
 Pi (film)
 Quran code
 Ramsey theory, for a notion of "unavoidable coincidences"
 Shemhamphorasch
 Texas sharpshooter fallacy
 Theomatics
 Synchronicity

References

Notes

External links

 
 The Bible Code, transcript of a story which aired on BBC Two, Thursday November 20, 2003, featuring comments by Drosnin, Rips, and McKay.
 Doron Witztum's codes page from Doron Witzum, a coauthor of the Statistical Sciences paper
 Tutorial Website from Professor Robert Haralick
 "Scientific Refutation of the Bible Codes" by Brendan McKay (Computer Science, Australian National University) and others
 The Bible Code: A Book Review by Allyn Jackson, plus Comments on the Bible Code by Shlomo Sternberg, Notices of the AMS September 1997 (see the American Mathematical Society)
 The Bible "Codes": a Textual Perspective, by Jeffrey H. Tigay (Near Eastern Languages and Civilizations, University of Pennsylvania)
 Madness in the Method, by Maya Bar-Hillel and Avishai Margalit, Chance, Dartmouth College
 Hidden Messages and The Bible Code from Committee for the Scientific Investigation of Claims of the Paranormal, publisher of Skeptical Inquirer Magazine
 Mathematical Codes in Genesis 1:1
 An example of website executing a Hebrew application of Bible code.

 
Language and mysticism
Torah